Charlie is a traditionally masculine given name in English-speaking countries, often a nickname for Charles, but is now used as a unisex name.  

For girls, Charlie acts either as a nickname for Charlotta, Charlotte or Charlene, or sometimes on its own. The different forms of spelling are most commonly used for the feminine forms. These spelling variants include Charlee, Charli, Charly, and Charleigh. Charley is another spelling variant for both genders.

Given names

 Charlie Adam (born 1985) English professional footballer
 Charlie Adler (born 1956), American voice actor
 Charlie Albright (born 1992), African classical pianist
 Charlie Austin (born 1989), English footballer
 Charlie Baker (born 1956), American businessman and politician
 Charlie Balducci (1975–2020), American actor
 Charlie Barnet (1913–1991), American jazz saxophonist, composer, and bandleader
 Charlie Barnett (disambiguation), multiple people
 Charlie Blackmon (born 1986), American baseball player
 Charlie Brooker (born 1971), British journalist, television presenter and writer
 Charlie Chaplin (1889–1977), British actor, filmmaker and composer
 Charlie Cole, American photojournalist, known for his photo of the Tank Man during the Tiananmen Square protests of 1989
 Charlie Crist (born 1956), American politician and lawyer
 Charlie Clements (born 1987), British actor
 Charlie Cook (born 1953), American reporter
 Charlie Covell (born 1984), British actress, writer and producer
 Charlie Coyle (born 1993), American Hockey Player
 Charli D'Amelio (born 2004), American social media personality and dancer
 Charlie Daniels (1936-2020), American singer, musician and songwriter
 Charlie Daniels (disambiguation), multiple people
 Charlie Davidson (born 1972), American football player
 Charlie Day (born 1976), American actor
 Charlie Dimmock (born 1966), English gardener
 Charlie Dixon (disambiguation), multiple people
 Charlie Ferguson (disambiguation), multiple people
 Charlie Gallagher (association footballer) (1940–2021), Irish football player
 Charlie Gallagher (Gaelic footballer) (1937–1989), Gaelic football player
 Charlie George (born 1950), English footballer
 Charlie George (comedian) (fl. 2020's), British comedian
 Charlie Glasco, New York City Police sergeant, most well known for his efforts to rescue John William Warde in 1938
 Charlie Goodsall (born 1969), Medical Revelation, first man in UK diagnosed with AIDS and renowned medical author 
 Charlie Haas (born 1972), American professional wrestler
 Charlie Hall (disambiguation), multiple people
 Charlie Heck (born 1996), American football player
 Charlie Hickman (1876–1934), American baseball player
 Charlie Hides (born 1964), American drag queen and comedian
 Charlie Hunnam (born 1980), English actor
 Charlie Jackson (American football coach) (born 1976), American football coach
 Charlie Jackson (defensive back) (born 1936), American football player
 Charlie Kelly (businessman) (born 1945), American businessman and mountain bike pioneer
 Charlie Kelly (baseball), 1880s baseball player
 Charlie Kelly, drummer for The Vaselines
 Charlie Kendall (born 1935), American football player
 Charles King (disambiguation), multiple people
 Charlie Manuel (born 1944), American baseball coach
 Charlie McCoy (born 1941), American musician
 Charlie McDermott (born 1990), American television actor
 Cr1TiKaL (born 1994), YouTuber, Twitch streamer, podcaster, musician, and actor
 Charlie McDonnell (born 1990), British vlogger
 Charlie Mills (harness racer) (1888–1972), German racer
 Charlie Moore (disambiguation), multiple people
 Charlie Mullins (born 1952), British businessman, founder of Pimlico Plumbers
 Charlie Murphy (actor) (1959–2017), American comedian
 Charlie Norris (footballer) (1881–1940) Australian footballer 
 Charlie Norris (wrestler) (born 1965), American wrestler
 Charlie Pabor (1846–1914), American baseball player
 Charlie Parker (1920–1955), American jazz saxophonist and composer
 Charlie Puth (born 1991), American singer and songwriter
 Charlie Reid (disambiguation), multiple people
 Charlie Reiter (born 1988), American footballer
 Charlie Rich (1932–1995), American singer
 Charlie Rose (born 1942), American television journalist
 Charlie Phil Rosenberg ("Charles Green") (1902–1976), American boxer
 Charlie Scene, pseudonym of Jordon Terrell from the band Hollywood Undead
 Charlie Sheen (born 1965), American actor
 Charles M. Schulz (1922–2000), American cartoonist of comic strip Peanuts
 Charlie Simpson (born 1985), British singer-songwriter
 Charlie Stewart, Scottish footballer
 Charlie Storwick (born 1998), Canadian singer
 Charlie Stubbs (American football) (born 1955), football coach
 Charlie Stubbs (footballer) (1920–1984), English footballer
 Charlie Swan (horse racing) (born 1968), Irish jockey
 Charlie Sloth, a British singer and DJ
 Charlie Taumoepeau (born 1997), American football player
 Charlie Trairat (born 1993), Thai actor and singer
 Charlie Tuna (1944–2016), American radio and television personality
 Charlie or Charles Walker (disambiguation), multiple people
 Charlie Watts (1941–2021), English drummer
 Charlie White (figure skater) (born 1987), American ice dancer
 Charlie Wiggins (1897–1979), American racing driver
 Charlie Woerner (born 1997), American football player
 Charlie Zhou, Chinese singer

People who have been given the pseudonym of Charlie
Chainsaw Charlie, later stage name for professional wrestler Terry Funk
Charlie Chop-off, unidentified American serial killer

Surname
 Arizona Charlie (1859–1932), American showman
 Dawson Charlie (c. 1865–1908), Canadian First Nations person, a co-discoverer of the gold that triggered the Klondike Gold Rush

Fictional characters

Charlotte 'Charli' Hunter, a character played by Mary-Kate Olsen in the 2002 film When in Rome.
Charlie, a character played by Jason Hervey in the American television sitcom Diff'rent Strokes.
Charlie, a character in the 1989 action movie No Holds Barred.
Charlie, a character in the 1994 American martial arts drama movie The Next Karate Kid.
Charlie, the female instructor in the film Top Gun.
Charlie, one of two so-called nuns in Nuns on the Run.
Charlie, the silent henchman in WordGirl.
Charlie, the dolphin Ernie encounters in "Journey to Ernie."
Charlie, the snail in Trudy's Time and Place House.
Charlie, the born baby in JoJo's Circus.
Charlie the Tuna, the cartoon mascot for StarKist Tuna
Charlie (Darkness or the Night Monster), in Don't Starve.
Charlie (Street Fighter), in the Street Fighter video games
Charlie (The Simpsons), on the television series The Simpsons
Charlie Andrews (Heroes), on the television series Heroes
Charlie Babbitt, in the 1988 film Rain Man.
Charlie Baileygates, in the 2000 film Me, Myself & Irene.
Charlie Baker, in the 2003 film Cheaper by the Dozen and its sequel
Charlie Banks, a character from the Ghost Whisperer
Charlie B. Barkin, the lead character in the 1989 film All Dogs Go to Heaven.
Charlie Bradbury, from the TV show Supernatural
Charlie Brown, the lead character in the Peanuts comic strip
Charlie Bucket, the title character of the novels Charlie and the Chocolate Factory and Charlie and the Great Glass Elevator.
Charlie Buckton, from the Australian soap opera Home and Away.
Charlie Calvin, from The Santa Clause film series
Charlie Chan, a Chinese-American detective created by Earl Derr Biggers
Charlie Cotton, from the British soap opera EastEnders
Charlie Cotton (2014 character), from the British soap opera EastEnders
Charlie Cronan, a character in the 1989 American action comedy movie Speed Zone.
Charlie, a fictional monkey in the South Korean computer-animated TV series Chiro.
Charlie Cutter, a character from the video game Uncharted.
Charlie Dalton, from the movie Dead Poets Society.
Charlie Davies, a main character from the television series Outsourced.
Charles DiLaurentis, a main antagonist from the television series Pretty Little Liars.
Charlie Drake, a character in the  1985 American science fantasy movie Explorers
Charlotte "Charlie" Duncan, the title character of the television series Good Luck Charlie.
Charlie Eppes, from the television series Numb3rs.
Charlie Francis, from the television series  Fringe
Charlie Frost, from the 1998 film  Jack Frost
Charlie (Two and a Half Men), from the television series Two and a Half Men.
Dr. Charlie Harris, from the 2012 television series Saving Hope.
Charlie Hesketh, from the film Kingsman: The Golden Circle
Charlie Horse, from television series Lamb Chop's Play-Along.
Charles Hunter, from Michael Crichton's novel "Pirate Latitudes."
Charlie Kelly, from the Irish soap opera Fair City.
Charlie Kelly, from the television series It's Always Sunny in Philadelphia.
Charlie Kelmeckis, in the 1999 novel The Perks of Being a Wallflower and 2012 film of the same name
Charlie Lyndsay, from the film Just Charlie
Charlie Morningstar, a character from Hazbin Hotel.
Charlie McGee, the lead character in Stephen King's novel Firestarter.
Charlie McKay, a character in the 2001 American romantic-comedy fantasy film Kate & Leopold.
Charlie Moore, the lead character of the television series Head of the Class.
Charlie Muffin, the main character of the Charlie M 1977 spy thriller novel, other novels by Brian Freemantle and Charlie Muffin, a 1979 made-for-television film
Charlie Nancy, the main character of the novel Anansi Boys by Neil Gaiman
Charlie Pace, from the television series Lost (TV series)
Charlie Peace, the title character of the British comic strip Charlie Peace (1964–1974)
Charlie Sand, Edward's driver from The Railway Series and the TV series Thomas and Friends.
Charlie Spring from the graphic novels Heartstopper by Alice Oseman
Charlie St. George, a character in the Netflix series 13 Reasons Why.
Charlie Stubbs, from the British soap opera Coronation Street
Charlie Swan (Twilight), in the novel series Twilight
Charlie Townsend, the unseen boss in the 1976 television series Charlie's Angels, the 2011 television series Charlie's Angels, the 2000 film Charlie's Angels and the 2003 film Charlie's Angels: Full Throttle
 "Charlie", the rank of the head of the Townsend Agency, successors to the founder Charlie Towsend, in the 2019 film  Charlie's Angels
Charlie Verducci, a character on the TV sitcom Top of the Heap.
Charlie Weasley, a character in the Harry Potter novels
Charlie Wilcox, a character played by Christopher Lloyd in the movie Suburban Commando.
Charlie the Unicorn, in a short film and viral video
Charlie, a purple engine from the TV series Thomas and Friends.
Charlie, one of the raptors from the film Jurassic World.
Charlie Watson, the female human protagonist in the 2018 Transformers movie Bumblebee, portrayed by Hailee Steinfeld
Charlie, a character from Adventure Time
Charlie aka Charley, a female character from Harry and His Bucket Full of Dinosaurs.
Charlie, a character from Legends of Tomorrow.
Captain Charlie, a character in the video game Pikmin 3.

References

See also

Carlie
 Charli XCX, British singer
Charlin (name)

English masculine given names
English feminine given names
English unisex given names
Hypocorisms
Swedish given names